Paul de Vries Asare (born 3 March 1996) is a Ghanaian professional footballer who currently plays for Wa All Stars in the Ghana Premier League.

Career
de Vries has played for several Ghanaian teams and is currently playing with Wa All Stars as a forward.

International career
In November 2013, coach Maxwell Konadu invited him to be a part of the Ghana squad for the 2013 WAFU Nations Cup. He helped the team to a first-place finish after Ghana beat Senegal by three goals to one.

Asare was part of the squad that participated in the 2014 African Nations Championship.

References

1996 births
Living people
Ghanaian footballers
Legon Cities FC players
WAFU Nations Cup players
Association football forwards
Ghana A' international footballers
2014 African Nations Championship players